Leucosyrinx claviforma is a species of sea snail, a marine gastropod mollusk in the family Pseudomelatomidae, the turrids and allies.

Description

Distribution
This marine species is endemic to Australia and occurs off Western Australia

References

  Kosuge, S. 1992. Report on the family Turridae collected along the north-western coast of Australia (Gastropoda). Bulletin of the Institute of Malacology, Tokyo 2(10): pls 58-59, text figs 1-24
 Sysoev, A.V. 1996. Deep-sea connoidean gastropods collected by the John Murray Expedition, 1933-34. Bulletin of the Natural History Museum, London (Zoology) 62(1): 1-30

External links
 

claviforma
Gastropods described in 1992
Gastropods of Australia